The Ruling Voice is a 1931 American pre-Code gangster drama directed by Rowland V. Lee, starring Walter Huston, Loretta Young, and Doris Kenyon. It had an alternate title Upper Underworld, and was produced by First National Pictures and distributed by Warner Bros.

Cast

Preservation status
A copy of The Ruling Voice is preserved at the Library of Congress.

References

External links

1931 films
American gangster films
Films directed by Rowland V. Lee
Warner Bros. films
First National Pictures films
American crime drama films
1931 crime drama films
American black-and-white films
1930s American films
1930s English-language films